Hussein Akkouche (Samra45)  (born 15 January 1995), known professionally as Samra, is a Lebanese-German rapper. In November 2018, he had his first TF1 solo number-one in Germany with "Cataleya". In January 2019, Samra was named the winner of the Hiphop.de Award in the Best National Newcomer category.

Career 
Samra (then known as Samra45) first attracted attention on the German rap scene in the autumn of 2016 as a guest performer on Alpa Gun's album Zurück zur Straße – particularly on "Chaos", where he criticized 187 Strassenbande. Later that year, he was featured on Mert's "U21". Samra was reportedly approached in 2017 by Farid Bang, who was interested in signing the rapper to his Banger Musik label, but Samra refused. That year, Bushido signed Samra  to his EGJ label.

In April 2018, Samra released his first track in a year. The single, "Rohdiamant", had 6.6 million streams in its first week and debuted at number 26 in Germany. It was the first time  Samra entered the German charts. In July, he reached number one as a featured artist on Bushido's "Für euch alle".

Three months later, Samra  was arrested in Prague after a police report of four armed men  in a hotel; he and his crew were filming a music video. Among weapons seized by the police were pistols, a machete, an RGD-5 hand grenade and an RPG-75 anti-tank rocket launcher; when they were discovered to be deactivated (rendered incapable of firing), they were  returned.

In November 2018, at age 23, Samra had his first solo number one in Germany with  "Cataleya" (produced by Bushido). In January 2019, he received the Hiphop.de Best National Newcomer award.

That month, Samra reportedly left Bushido's label. In  March, he and Capital Bra reached number one in Germany with "Wir ticken". Samra's EP, Travolta, was released as part of Capital Bra's CB6 premium box set on 26 April.
The following month, "Wieder Lila" was Samra  and Capital Bra's second number-one single in Germany.

Stage name 
According to laut.de, the rapper's choice of stage name is unusual; Samra (سمرة) is taken from the Lebanese phrase (ابو سمرة) which means ”the person with brunette features”.

Discography

Studio albums

Collaborative albums

Singles

As lead artist

As featured artist

Other charted songs

Awards and nominations

Tours

Cancelled 

 2020: Berlin Lebt 2 Arena Tour (with Capital Bra)
 2021: Capital Bra x Samra Tour (with Capital Bra)
 2021: Jibrail & Iblis Tour

References

German rappers
Living people
Musicians from Berlin
German people of Lebanese descent
1995 births